Sierra Leone – United States relations are bilateral relations between Sierra Leone and the United States.

History 

U.S. relations with Sierra Leone began with missionary activities in the 19th century. In 1959, the U.S. opened a consulate in Freetown and elevated it to embassy status when Sierra Leone became independent in 1961. U.S.-Sierra Leone relations today are cordial, with ethnic ties between groups in the two countries receiving increasing historical interest. Many thousands of Sierra Leoneans reside in the United States. In fiscal year 2006, total U.S. bilateral aid to Sierra Leone in all categories was $29.538 million. U.S. assistance focused on the consolidation of peace, democracy and human rights, health education, particularly combating HIV/AIDS, and human resources development.

As of 2021, the United States Ambassador to Sierra Leone is David Dale Reimer.  Sierra Leone's Ambassador to the U.S. is H. E. Bockari Kortu Stevens and the Sierra Leone embassy is located in Washington.

See also 
 Foreign relations of Sierra Leone
 Foreign relations of the United States

References

External links 
History of Sierra Leone - U.S. relations

 Embassy of Sierra Leone in the United States
 Embassy of the United States in Sierra Leone
 Embassy of the United States in Sierra Leone Facebook Fan Page

 
Bilateral relations of the United States
United States